Rádio Nacional de Angola is a national radio station in Angola. It is based in the capital of Luanda. The station broadcasts in Portuguese, English, French, Spanish, and major local languages and is operated by the Government of Angola.

External links
Official site 

Radio stations in Angola
French-language radio stations
Portuguese-language radio stations
Spanish-language radio stations
Multilingual broadcasters
Radio stations established in 2007